Amityville 3-D (also known as Amityville III: The Demon) is a 1983 supernatural horror film directed by Richard Fleischer and starring Tony Roberts, Tess Harper, Robert Joy, Candy Clark, Lori Loughlin and Meg Ryan. It is the third film based in the Amityville Horror series, it was written by William Wales. It was one of a spate of 3-D films released in the early 1980s, and was the only Orion Pictures film filmed in the format.

Due to a lawsuit between the Lutz family and Dino De Laurentiis over the storyline which did not involve the Lutz family, Amityville 3-D was not initially promoted as a sequel, and the name Lutz is never used in the film. However the film does make a reference to the original Amityville Horror story. The character of John Baxter (Roberts) is loosely based on Stephen Kaplan who at the time was trying to prove the Lutzes' story was a hoax. It was panned upon release.

Plot
After he exposes a pair of con artists with his partner Melanie in the infamous 112 Ocean Avenue house in Amityville, journalist John Baxter is persuaded to purchase the house by real estate agent Clifford Sanders. While preparing the house for John, Clifford investigates footsteps in the attic. He is locked in the room, where a swarm of flies attack and kill him. John believes Clifford died of a stroke, even after Melanie shows him some photos she took of the real estate agent before his death, depicting him as a rotting corpse.

While John is at work, he nearly dies in a malfunctioning elevator. Simultaneously, Melanie experiences bizarre occurrences in John's house. She is found later that night by John, cowering and hysterical against the wall. Her attempts to convince John that something is inside the house fall on deaf ears. Later, while looking over blowups of the photos of Clifford, Melanie discovers a demonic-looking face in the pictures. When she attempts to show the photos to John, she is killed in a horrific car accident. Melanie's death is ruled accidental by everyone, including John, who remains oblivious to the evil in his home.

While John is away one day, his daughter, Susan, her friend Lisa, and two boyfriends use an Ouija board in the attic. The game tells them that Susan is in danger. Growing bored, Susan and the others go out in John's motorboat where she falls into the water and drowns. John's estranged wife Nancy, who had come over looking for Susan,  who is surprised to see a drenched Susan silently walk up the stairs. Outside John arrives home to find Susan's friends bringing her lifeless body to shore. Nancy has a nervous breakdown and believing Susan is still alive and will return shortly, refuses to leave, even for Susan's funeral.

After having nightmares about the old well in the basement and unable to deal with Nancy's delusions that Susan is still alive, John allows his friend, paranormal investigator Doctor Elliot West, and a team of paranormal investigators to set up in the house, to help prove if Nancy actually saw something or not. As Elliot and John watch, Nancy is confronted by a spectral being speaking in Susan's voice. Nancy follows the spectre into the basement, where the old well has filled with liquid. Elliot urges whatever is in the well to reveal itself and restore Susan to life. Instead, a demon leaps from the well, burns Elliot's face with fiery breath and drags him to Hell. The house begins to implode. Much of Elliot's team is killed by flying and exploding objects, but John, Nancy, and several others escape through a window. As John and Nancy leave, the well bubbles ominously as an eerily glowing fly emerges from it.

Cast
 Tony Roberts as John Baxter
 Tess Harper as Nancy Baxter
 Robert Joy as Dr. Elliot West
 Candy Clark as Melanie
 Lori Loughlin as Susan Baxter
 Meg Ryan as Lisa
 Neill Barry as Jeff
 Josefina Echánove as Dolores
 John Beal as Harold Caswell
 Leora Dana as Emma Caswell
 John Harkins as Clifford Sanders
 Peter Kowanko as Roger
 Carlos Romero as David Cohler

Critical response

Amityville 3D maintains an 18% rating on Rotten Tomatoes based on 22 reviews from critics. The website's critical consensus calls it "a gimmicky Amityville retread with insufferable characters".

Variety wrote, "A new cast of characters and the addition of 3-D does little to pump new life, supernatural or otherwise, into this tired genre.” Janet Maslin of The New York Times wrote, "Once the first two films in a series have exhausted most opportunities for action, the third is liable to average half a dozen exposition scenes for every eventful episode."  Of the 3D, she said "3-D exposition is the stuff of which headaches are made; the footage tends to be so dark that you can barely tell whether it's night or day."

Release
While released theatrically in 3-D, the only 3-D home release of the film has been on DVD in the UK and as of August 2012, also in Scandinavia. In October 2013, Scream Factory released a 3-D Blu-ray of Amityville 3-D, along with The Amityville Horror and Amityville II: The Possession. A novelization of the film was written by Gordon McGill while Howard Blake wrote a score for the film, which was released on CD in 2000 as part of the Original Orchestral Score for Flash Gordon.

MGM Home Entertainment originally released the DVD with the theatrical title Amityville 3-D (also the title on the opening title card of the film itself) on the box artwork. However they received many complaints as the film was not actually in 3-D and some even mistakenly mistook the release as a 3-D version of the original 1979 film The Amityville Horror. Due to this they re-released the DVD with the foreign territory title Amityville III: The Demon on the box artwork despite the film itself retaining "Amityville 3-D" on the title card.

Box office
Amityville 3-D was #1 at the box office its opening weekend, grossing $2.4 million according to Box Office Mojo. Its final US gross was $6.3 million. It was the last film in the series released theatrically until the remake of The Amityville Horror in 2005.

References

External links
 
 

1983 3D films
1983 films
1983 horror films
1983 independent films
1980s ghost films
1980s supernatural horror films
American 3D films
American ghost films
American haunted house films
American independent films
American sequel films
American supernatural horror films
Amityville Horror films
Demons in film
1980s English-language films
Films about con artists
Films about divorce
Films about grieving
Films about journalists
Films about mass murder
Films about photojournalists
Films about writers
Films directed by Richard Fleischer
Films scored by Howard Blake
Films set in 1983
Films set in Long Island
Films shot in New Jersey
Films about hoaxes
Native American cemeteries in popular culture
Orion Pictures films
Spontaneous human combustion in fiction
1980s American films